Joe Russo's Almost Dead is an American rock band formed in 2013 that mainly covers the music of the Grateful Dead. Formed by Furthur and Benevento/Russo Duo drummer Joe Russo, the band played their first show on January 26, 2013 at the Brooklyn Bowl in Brooklyn, New York. In addition to drummer Joe Russo, the band also includes Ween's bassist Dave Dreiwitz, keyboardist Marco Benevento, Scott Metzger on guitar and vocals, and Tom Hamilton of Brothers Past, Ghost Light, and American Babies on guitar and vocals.

Performances

2013

The band's first concert was on January 26, 2013, at the Brooklyn Bowl in Brooklyn, New York for the second night of the Freaks Ball XIII. As Joe Russo recalls in the September 2017 Relix Magazine interview, he was supposed to play in the Dean Ween Group (Mickey Melchiondo from Ween's side project) on that second night but shortly before the date, Mickey cancelled the Dean Ween Group appearance and Joe pulled together Bustle In Your Hedgerow (Russo, Dreiwitz, Metzger and Benevento's Led Zeppelin band) and added Tom Hamilton to form Joe Russo's Almost Dead. JRAD played one more show that year at the Capitol Theatre in Port Chester, New York on December 27, 2013.

2014

JRAD slowly began playing more shows in 2014, including several sets at summer festivals including the Gathering of the Vibes in Bridgeport, Connecticut, Hardly Strictly Bluegrass Festival in San Francisco, California, and String Cheese Incident's Hulaween Festival in Live Oak, Florida. They played two nights in Chicago and two nights in Colorado ending in a New Year's run on December 29, 30, and 31, at the Capitol Theatre, in Port Chester, New York, with the Grateful Dead's own Phil Lesh on bass filling in for Dreiwitz. The JRAD run with Phil Lesh was dubbed "PhilRAD." JRAD played a total of 10 shows in 2014.

2015
Forty-six shows were listed on the band's website for 2015, including performances at Electric Forest, All Good Festival, Mountain Jam and High Sierra Music Festival.

2016
JRAD had their debut appearance on Jam Cruise in January performing two consecutive nights in the Pantheon Theatre and a Pool Deck set. In July they would play their first show at Red Rocks Amphitheatre in support of Umphrey's McGee. In February 2016, it was announced that Joe Russo's Almost Dead would play a three show run at Brooklyn Bowl for Freak's Ball XVI, from March 24-March 26.

With Ween returning to tour, Dave Dreiwitz missed JRAD's five-night 2016 New England spring tour. Jon Shaw of Shakey Graves and Cass McCombs filled in for Dreiwitz. In August, they played two performances at Lockn' Festival in Virginia, which featured two headline performances by Ween and Phish.

Keyboardist Jeff Chimenti filled in for Benevento at two performances in New Orleans in April 2016.

JRAD played a total of 36 shows in 2016.

2017
In 2017 JRAD performed forty shows including their first headlining indoor arena show, their first headlining Red Rocks Amphitheatre show and a return to the Dominican Republic for their second year in a row at Dominican Holidaze. Their first headlining arena show at the 1stBank Center in Broomfield, Colorado was a sold-out show originally scheduled for Red Rocks Amphitheatre but due to a late spring snowstorm, the concert was relocated overnight to the 1stBank Center. The band also performed twelve sold-out nights at the Brooklyn Bowl in New York City during the Spring and Fall of 2017. On March 9, the first night of the spring Brooklyn Bowl run and the band's one-hundredth concert, they premiered Russo and Hamilton's "Keeping it Simple", their first-ever original song. For three of the Brooklyn Bowl performances Oteil Burbridge filled in for Dreiwitz while on Ween tour.  On August 31, 2017 the band headlined a sold-out performance at Red Rocks with Oteil Burbridge on bass guitar filling in for Dreiwitz out on Ween tour.  In October, between the dates of the 5th-7th and the 12th-14th, the band performed the latter six sold-out shows at the Brooklyn Bowl.  JRAD's 125th show saw John Mayer, current lead-guitarist of Dead & Company, sitting in on guitar on Friday, October 13 in the first and second set of the show.

2018

JRAD started off 2018 with three sold-out nights in January at the Capitol Theatre in Port Chester, New York followed by a spring tour beginning on February 15 in Nashville, Tennessee with guest vocalist Nicole Atkins performing 'Doin' That Rag'.

Rolling Stone named JRAD's Peach Festival performance "Best Scene-Stealer", saying that, "JRAD takes improvisational jam rock to the nth degree."

Members
Joe Russo – drums, vocals
Dave Dreiwitz – bass, vocals
Marco Benevento – keyboards, vocals
Scott Metzger – guitar, vocals
Tom Hamilton – guitar, vocals

Live Substitutes
Phil Lesh – bass (December 30 & 31, 2014)
Jon Shaw – bass, vocals (Spring 2016 tour), (6/3/2017), Rabbit Rabbit Asheville NC (4/29/22 and 4/30/2022), (Sweetwater Fest 5/01/2022)
Jeff Chimenti – keyboards, vocals (April 2016, 2 shows)
Oteil Burbridge – bass, vocals (March 2017, 3 shows; 8/31/17 at Red Rocks; 10/20/18 at The Anthem)
John Mayer – guitar, vocals (November 9, 2018) at Wiltern Theatre
Evan Roque – drums (July 27 and 28, 2019) 
Ben Perowsky – drums (July 27 and 28, 2019) 
Bob Weir - guitar, vocals (January 26th, 2023)

References

External links

Joe Russo's Almost Dead on YouTube
Joe Russo's Almost Dead on Live Music Archive
Tom Hamilton sits down with Ira Haberman of The Sound Podcast for a feature interview
Marco sits down with Ira Haberman of The Sound Podcast for a feature interview
Scott sits down with Ira Haberman of The Sound Podcast for a feature interview

2013 establishments in New York City
Musical groups established in 2013
Musical groups from Brooklyn
Rock music groups from New York (state)